BorgWarner Inc. is an American automotive supplier headquartered in Auburn Hills, Michigan. The company maintains production facilities and technical systems at 93 sites (as of June 6, 2022) in 22 countries worldwide and has around 49,000 employees. BorgWarner is one of the 25 largest automotive suppliers in the world. Frédéric Lissalde has been CEO of BorgWarner Inc. since August 1, 2018.

The company was formed in 1928 as Borg-Warner Corporation. It was formed as a fusion of companies including Borg & Beck, Marvel-Schebler, Warner Gear and Mechanics Universal Joint. In 1987, Borg-Warner Corporation ceased to exist as a result of a series of complex financial transactions, although a new company of the same name (still Borg-Warner Corporation) continued the business. At the same time, Borg-Warner Automotive Inc. was created as a subsidiary of the new company; the mother company, the new Borg-Warner Corporation, was later known as Borg-Warner Security Corporation. In 1993, Borg-Warner Automotive Inc. was spun-off from Borg-Warner Security Corporation and became an independent company . In 2005, BorgWarner's world headquarters was moved from Chicago to the metro Detroit area. BorgWarner has bought other automotive companies including Delphi Technologies, Akasol, Santroll, Hubei Surpass Sun Electric (SSE), and Rhombus Energy Solutions. In December 2022, it was announced BorgWarner had acquired the Brügg-headquartered company, Drivetek AG - specialists in engineering and product development services for inverters, electric drive solutions, and power electronics.

BorgWarner has close links with the Indianapolis 500. In the NTT INDYCAR SERIES, BorgWarner’s EFR (Engineered for Racing) turbocharger has been fitted in all participating vehicles in each season since 2012. Since 1936, the company has also appeared as the sponsor of the Borg-Warner Trophy, which serves as an annual prize for the winner of the Indianapolis 500.

In 2017, the supplier became a partner of the SOS Children’s Villages.

Further information can be found in the annually published Sustainability Report.

Notes

References

External links
 
Website of BorgWarner Inc.
History of BorgWarner Inc.

 
American brands
American companies established in 1880
Auburn Hills, Michigan
Auto parts suppliers of the United States
Automotive transmission makers
Companies based in Oakland County, Michigan
Companies listed on the New York Stock Exchange
Manufacturing companies based in Michigan
Manufacturing companies established in 1880
Turbocharger manufacturers